Horace Stephens 'Tubby' Edmonds (23 December 1908 – 13 July 1975) was an Australian rules footballer who played in the VFL between 1929 and 1934 for the Collingwood Football Club, between 1934 and 1935 for the Richmond Football Club and one game for the Footscray Football Club in 1937.

Family
The son of Neil Flower Edmonds (1871–1918), and Johannah "Annie" Edmonds (1873–1951), née Long, later Mrs. William Merriman, Horace Stephens Edmonds was born at Diamond Creek, Victoria on 23 December 1908.

Horace Edmonds married to Jessie Adeline Williams (1910–1993) in 1931. They had two sons, William (1938-2021) and Robert (1946–2006). Robert played a short time for Richmond Reserves.

Football

Richmond (VFL)
He was granted a clearance from Collingwood to Richmond on 30 June 1934.

Brighton (VFA)
Cleared from Sandringham in June 1938, he played two senior games for Brighton in 1938.

Hawthorn (VFL)
He played in two games for the Hawthorn Reserves in 1953, at the age of 46.

Recognition
He was awarded a Richmond Life Membership posthumously in 2018.

Footnotes

References 

 Alf Brown, "The Man who stayed on the Fence makes a Comeback", The Herald, (Tuesday, 1 September 1953), p.18.
 Hogan P: The Tigers Of Old, Richmond FC, (Melbourne), 1996. 
 World War Two Nominal Roll: Corporal Horace Stephen Edmonds (VX130535/V340226), Department of Veterans' Affairs.

External links
 Horrie Edmonds' playing statistics, from AFL Tables.
 Horrie Edmonds, at AustralianFootball.com.
 Horrie Edmonds, at Boyles Football Photos.
 Horrie "Tubby" Edmonds, at The VFA Project.
 Horrie Edmonds 1929-1934, at Collingwood Forever.

1908 births
1975 deaths
Australian rules footballers from Melbourne
Australian Rules footballers: place kick exponents
Collingwood Football Club players
Collingwood Football Club Premiership players
Richmond Football Club players
Richmond Football Club Premiership players
Western Bulldogs players
Diamond Creek Football Club players
Three-time VFL/AFL Premiership players
People from Diamond Creek, Victoria